Once Upon a Time in the Provinces (translit. Odnazhdy v provintsii) is a 2008 Russian drama film written and directed by Katya Shagalova. It was entered into the 30th Moscow International Film Festival where it won the FIPRESCI Prize.

Cast
 Igor Afanasev
 Leonid Bichevin
 Elvira Bolgova
 Alexandr Golubev
 Yuliya Peresild
 Lyubov Tolkalina

References

External links
 

2008 films
2008 drama films
Russian drama films
2000s Russian-language films